Chen Meng (born 15 January 1994) is a Chinese table tennis player and the current World No. 2 in Women's Singles. She joined the provincial team when she was 9 and joined the national team when she was only 13 in 2007. She is the women's singles champion of the ITTF Women's World Cup in 2020, the ITTF World Tour Grand Finals in 2017, 2018, 2019 and 2020 and also at the inaugural WTT Singapore Smash. She is also the silver medalist of women's singles in the 2019 World Championships and a double gold medalist in the 2020 Summer Olympics.

Career

2011 
Won 4 golds at the World Junior Table Tennis Championships in girls' singles, girls' doubles, mixed doubles and teams.

2020
After competitive table tennis resumed following the pandemic, Chen swept the world cup, ITTF pro tour finals, and 2020 All China National Championships.

2021
In May, Chen was selected to represent China in the women's singles and team event at the Tokyo Olympics. Chen won the first leg of the Chinese Olympic Scrimmage but lost to Wang Manyu in the finals of the second leg. Chen again lost to Wang in a closed-door scrimmage in June.

In an interview in July, Chen revealed that she had been in close contact with Ma Lin and Li Xiaoxia regarding mental preparations for the Tokyo Olympics.

Chen competed in the Tokyo 2020 Olympics for the women's singles. Chen won her semi-final match against Yu Mengyu of Singapore 4–0 and her quarter-match against Doo Hoi Kem of Hong Kong 4–2 after trailing 2–0. She then won gold in the finals match against her compatriot Sun Yingsha, defeating her 4–2. After the match, Chen noted that both she and Sun were both very nervous but played okay, and that Chen's extra experience helped push her over the top. Chen along with Sun Yingsha and Wang Manyu, competed in the women's teams final match on 5 August 2021 and scored a 3–0 victory over Japan to win the gold medal, continuing China's undefeated streak in the event.

In August, Chen remarked that the level of play at the China National Games was harder than the Olympics. Chen won fourth place at the China National Games in September, but her bronze-medal-match opponent Liu Shiwen remarked that Chen was injured and playing far below her normal level.

Titles (senior level)

Singles
ITTF World Tour Grand Finals – 2017, 2018, 2019, 2020
ITTF World Tour (15) – China open 2012, 2013, 2019, Qatar open 2012, 2017, 2020, Swedish 2013, 2019, Japan open 2015, Australian open 2017, German open 2017, 2020, Austrian open 2018, Korea open 2019, Hungarian open 2019
Summer Olympics 2020 – singles gold medal
WTT Grand Smash – Singapore 2022

Doubles
ITTF World Tour Grand Finals – 2017 (with Zhu Yuling)
ITTF World Tour (13) – 
with Zhu: Kuwait 2012, China 2012, 2013, 2016, Australian 2017
with Liu Shiwen: China 2015, Japan 2019
with Mu Zi: Swedish 2015
with Wang Manyu: Qatar 2017, Australian 2019, Korea 2019
with Ding Ning: Korea 2018, Swedish 2019

Personal life
Chen Meng and actor Huang Xiaoming are second cousins. Their paternal grandmothers are sisters.

References

External links

Living people
1994 births
Chinese female table tennis players
Asian Games medalists in table tennis
Table tennis players at the 2014 Asian Games
Table tennis players at the 2018 Asian Games
Asian Games gold medalists for China
Asian Games silver medalists for China
Medalists at the 2014 Asian Games
Medalists at the 2018 Asian Games
Table tennis players from Qingdao
World Table Tennis Championships medalists
Olympic gold medalists for China
Medalists at the 2020 Summer Olympics
Olympic medalists in table tennis
Table tennis players at the 2020 Summer Olympics
Olympic table tennis players of China
21st-century Chinese women